Some Skunk Funk is an live album by Randy Brecker and Michael Brecker. It was recorded, on November 11, 2003, at the Forum in Leverkusen, Germany and was released in November 2005.

In 2006 it won Grammy Awards for Best Jazz Instrumental Solo (Michael Brecker) and Best Large Jazz Ensemble Album.

Track listing

Personnel 
Musicians
 Michael Brecker – tenor saxophone
 Randy Brecker – trumpet
 Jim Beard – piano, synthesizer
 Koji Paul Shigihara – guitar
 Will Lee – bass guitar
 Peter Erskine – drums
 Marcio Doctor – percussion
 WDR Big Band
 Vince Mendoza – conductor, arranger
 Rob Bruynen – trumpet
 Andy Haderer – trumpet
 Rick Kiefer – trumpet
 John Marshall – trumpet
 Klaus Osterloh – trumpet
 David Horler – trombone
 Bernt Laukamp – trombone
 Ludwig Nuss – trombone
 Mattis Cederberg – bass trombone
 Harold Rosenstein – alto saxophone
 Heiner Wiberny – alto saxophone
 Olivier Peters – tenor saxophone
 Rolf Römer – tenor saxophone
 Jens Neufang – baritone saxophone

Production
 Joachim Becker – producer
 Lucas Schmid – producer
 Peter Brandt – engineer
 Klaus Genuit – mixing

References

2005 albums
Big band albums
Grammy Award for Best Large Jazz Ensemble Album